Close to the Edge is the fifth album by the British progressive rock band Yes.

Close to the Edge may also refer to:
"Close to the Edge" (song), a 1972 song from the Yes album of the same name
 Close to the Edge (Blessid Union of Souls album), 2008
 Close to the Edge (Diamond Rio album), or the title song
 Close To The Edge Provincial Park and Protected Area, British Columbia, Canada
 Close to the Edge (cave), a cave in the park
 "Close to the Edge", one of the short stories in Terry Pratchett's book The Colour of Magic
 Close to the Edge (TV series), a British structured reality television show

See also

 "Closer to the Edge", a 2010 song by Thirty Seconds to Mars